A.B. Cop is a futuristic 3D racing arcade game released by Sega in 1990. It never received any official port to home consoles.

Gameplay 

Gameplay is similar to that of Chase H.Q.. The player takes on the role of the A.B. (Air Bike) Cop who must chase down and destroy the perpetrators of various crimes (which changes every level) before the time limit expires. A.B Cop introduced an element new to the racing genre: the end-of-level guardian.

Development and release 
A.B. Cop was developed by Aicom and released in arcades by Sega in 1990 using their X Board. The soundtrack was composed by Hikoshi Hashimoto. The game has not received any official port to home consoles.

Reception 
In Japan, Game Machine listed A.B. Cop on their March 1, 1991 issue as being the thirteenth most-successful upright/cockpit arcade unit of the month, outperforming titles such as Winning Run Suzuka GP and Special Criminal Investigation. Mark Caswell of Zzap!64 gave the game an overall mixed outlook. Spanish magazine Micromanía gave it a positive outlook. Kurt Kalata of Hardcore Gaming 101 gave it a positive retrospective outlook.

References

External links 
 A.B. Cop at GameFAQs
 A.B. Cop at Giant Bomb
 A.B. Cop at Killer List of Videogames
 A.B. Cop at MobyGames

1990 video games
Aicom games
Arcade video games
Arcade-only video games
Science fiction racing games
Sega arcade games
Video games about police officers
Video games developed in Japan